Homoeothele is a monotypic genus of Australian ground spiders containing the single species, Homoeothele micans. It was first described by Eugène Simon in 1908, and has only been found in Australia.

References

Gnaphosidae
Monotypic Araneomorphae genera
Spiders of Australia
Taxa named by Eugène Simon